SS Ursae Minoris is a cataclysmic variable star system in the constellation Ursa Minor. It was discovered visually and by its X-ray emissions separately in 1982 before they were understood to be coming from the same object. It is classified as a SU Ursae Majoris variable subclass of dwarf nova in that it has both 'normal' outbursts of increased brightness as well as even brighter 'superoutbursts'. However, unlike other SU Ursae Majoris stars, the superoutbursts are of longer duration than the regular outbursts.

The two stars orbit each other every 98 minutes.

References

Ursa Minor (constellation)
Ursae Minoris, SS
Dwarf novae